Martina Altenberger is an Austrian Paralympic alpine skier. She represented Austria in Para-alpine skiing, at the 1988 Paralympic Winter Games in Innsbbruck, winner of three gold medals.

Career 
She competed at the 1986 World Disabled Ski Championships.

She competed in the Innsbruck 1988 Winter Paralympics in the LW6 / 8 category, Altenberger won three gold medals: in the giant slalom (with a time of 1: 45.59, besting the American Kathy Pitcher , who won silver in 2: 00.57 and the Polish Eszbieta Dadok, bronze in 2: 06.05,  slalom (time 1: 15.63; in 2nd place Gunilla Ahren in 1: 19.09 and in third place Eszbieta Dadok in 1: 37.46), and downhill (race ended in 1: 13.87, ahead of Nancy Gustafson in 1: 14.51 and Gunilla Ahrenin 1: 17.64.

She trained with Skiclub Niedernsill.

References 

Living people
Paralympic alpine skiers of Austria
Paralympic gold medalists for Austria
Austrian female alpine skiers
Alpine skiers at the 1988 Winter Paralympics
Medalists at the 1988 Winter Paralympics
Date of birth missing (living people)
Place of birth missing (living people)
20th-century Austrian women